The 2007 Open Gaz de France was a women's tennis tournament played on indoor hard courts. It was the 15th edition of the event and was part of the Tier II series of the 2007 WTA Tour. It took place at the Stade Pierre de Coubertin in Paris, France, from 5 February through 11 February 2007. Fourth-seeded Nadia Petrova won the singles title.

Finals

Singles

 Nadia Petrova defeated  Lucie Šafářová 4–6, 6–1, 6–4
It was Nadia Petrova's 1st title of the year and her 7th overall.

Doubles

 Cara Black /  Liezel Huber defeated  Gabriela Navrátilová /  Vladimíra Uhlířová 6–2, 6–0

External links
 ITF tournament edition details

Open Gaz de France
2007
Open Gaz de France
Open Gaz de France
Open Gaz de France
Open Gaz de France